Chicken Soup for the Soul Entertainment is an American self-help, consumer goods and media company based in Cos Cob, Connecticut. It is known for the Chicken Soup for the Soul book series. The first book, like most subsequent titles in the series, consisted of inspirational true stories about ordinary people's lives. The books are widely varied, each with a different theme. Today Chicken Soup for the Soul Publishing, LLC continues to publish about a dozen new books per year.

The company has branched out into other categories such as food, pet food, and television programming.

History

Books 
Motivational speakers Jack Canfield and Mark Victor Hansen collaborated on the first Chicken Soup for the Soul book, compiling inspirational, true stories they had heard from their audience members. Many of the stories came from members of the audience of their inspirational talks. The book was rejected by major publishers in New York but accepted by a small, self-help publisher in Florida called HCI.

After the success of the first book, Canfield and Hansen, with HCI, published additional, similar Chicken Soup for the Soul titles. Later, they published Chicken Soup for the Soul books for specific demographics, such as Chicken Soup for the Teenage Soul, which came out in 1997 and was a major best-seller. New Chicken Soup for the Soul titles and sequels to existing books have been published on a regular basis since the first book came out in 1993. In 2009, author Adeline Lee Zhia Ern was found to have plagiarized the story "Happiness" by Sarah Provençal from Jack Canfield's Chicken Soup for the Teenage Soul IV.

Expansion from books 
In 2008, the founders, Jack Canfield and Mark Victor Hansen, sold the company to a new ownership group led by William J. Rouhana and Robert D. Jacobs. Since then all new titles have been published by Chicken Soup for the Soul Publishing, LLC and distributed by Simon & Schuster.

Under the new ownership group, Chicken Soup for the Soul has expanded into other products besides books. The company markets pet foods under the brand Chicken Soup for the Pet Lover's Soul and a line of soups, sauces and other prepared foods under the brand Chicken Soup for the Soul.

Entertainment 
In 2013, the company announced plans to produce a television series and movie with Alcon Entertainment. Chicken Soup for the Soul has produced television programming with other partners, including PBS. In 2016, Chicken Soup for the Soul acquired a majority stake in the website A Plus.

Chicken Soup for the Soul Entertainment went public in 2017. Chicken Soup for the Soul Entertainment now owns Screen Media Ventures, LLC, an independent television and film distribution company, and Popcornflix, an ad-based online video service.

On March 28, 2019, it was announced that Sony Pictures Television would sell a majority stake of Sony Crackle to Chicken Soup for the Soul Entertainment, with the service has reverted into the "Crackle" name.

On November 5, 2019, it was announced that the Chicken Soup for the Soul Entertainment division would purchase foreign sales company Foresight Unlimited for the new Screen Media division. 

On December 15, 2020, Sony traded its remaining shares in Crackle for a yet to be disclosed preferential stake to Chicken Soup for the Soul Entertainment effectively giving them control of the ad-supported streaming service. As of 2020, the series included more than 250 titles.

In April 2021, Chicken Soup for the Soul acquired the film and television catalogue of Sonar Entertainment. In return, Sonar will hold a 5 percent stake in a new AVOD network featuring its library.

On March 2, 2022, Chicken Soup for the Soul announced its acquisition of specialty film distributor, 1091 Pictures, for $15.55 million, in a mix of cash ($8 million) and stock (newly issued Series A preferred stock and Class A common stock). The deal included an estimated 4,000 movies and TV series from the 1091 catalog, as well as its portfolio of free, ad-supported networks and channels.

On May 11, 2022, Chicken Soup for the Soul announced its intention to acquire Redbox for $357 million ($36 million in stock and $321 million in assumed debt). The acquisition closed on August 11, 2022.

Awards
The original series held a spot on the New York Times Best Seller list continuously from 1994 to 1998.

Chicken Soup for the Soul: What I Learned From the Dog was named "Best Anthology" of 2010 by the Dog Writers Association of America.

See also
 List of Chicken Soup for the Soul books

Notes

External links
 

1993 establishments in Connecticut
American companies established in 1993
Publishing companies established in 1993
Mass media companies established in 1993
Companies based in Fairfield County, Connecticut
Companies listed on the Nasdaq
2017 initial public offerings
Greenwich, Connecticut